The Capcom Pro Tour is a series of international fighting game tournaments sponsored by video game developer Capcom. The Pro Tour culminates in the annual Capcom Cup, a single-day tournament held in the San Francisco Bay Area.

2014

Capcom Cup 2014 Qualifiers

2015

Capcom Cup 2015 qualifiers

2016

Like the previous year, Capcom Pro Tour 2016 has a US$500,000 prize pool. Street Fighter V replaced Ultra Street Fighter IV as the game played during the series. Final Round 19 was the first major tournament in the circuit. Capcom plans to make the Capcom Cup itself much more balanced nationality-wise. The organizers also stated that only first-place finishers of each twelve premier events and regional finals can qualify, meaning that if someone who is already qualified takes first place, another global points qualifier will be added. Eight players will qualify from regional point leaderboards (two from North America, Europe, Asia, and Latin America each).

Capcom Cup 2016 qualifiers

2017

The 2017 Capcom Pro Tour took off on February 17, 2017. The points leaderboards and qualification mechanics for the 2017 Capcom Cup were greatly streamlined in the 2017 season, with automatic qualification upon winning a Premier Event being taken away. This Capcom Pro Tour still features Regional Finals, but the Regional points leaderboard is otherwise unused. This Pro Tour features more online events than the 2016 event did. The finals were won by MenaRD, using Birdie.

2018

In total, 465 players scored points in the season. The finals were won by Gachikun, using Rashid.

2019
In total, 508 players scored points in the season. Idom won using Poison.

2020
Live events in 2020 were cancelled due to the COVID-19 pandemic.

The Evo weekend was replaced with an online-only tournament. Street Fighter V was not selected for this event.

At the first official online event, two leading competitors, including Idom, dropped out live on air, citing the poor netcode of Street Fighter V.

In August 2020, top player Punk was penalised by Capcom for a public outburst against the poor netcode.

References

External links
 Official Website

2013 establishments
Capcom Cup